Jean Marlene Saubert (May 1, 1942 – May 14, 2007) was an alpine ski racer from the United States.  She won two medals in the 1964 Winter Olympics at Innsbruck, Austria. After graduating from college, Saubert became an educator.

Early life
Born in Roseburg, Oregon, Saubert grew up in Cascadia and graduated from Lakeview High School in 1960. She learned to ski at Hoodoo Butte and raced competitively at Mount Hood and Mount Bachelor.

Racing career
In 1962, Saubert earned a spot on the U.S. Ski Team and her first international competition was the 1962 World Championships in Chamonix, France, where she finished sixth in the giant slalom. In 1963 and 1964, she was the U.S. downhill and giant slalom champion, and also won the slalom and combined national championships in 1964. She won a total of 8 U.S. championships in her racing career.

At the 1964 Winter Olympics in Innsbruck, Saubert won a bronze medal in the slalom and a silver medal in the giant slalom, losing only to French sisters Christine and Marielle Goitschel. Saubert was the only multiple medal winner for the U.S. in those Olympics, and her medals represented two of the six medals won by the entire United States team. Two years later, Saubert finished fourth in the slalom at the 1966 World Championships in Portillo, Chile. Following the world championships, held in August, Saubert retired from international competition at age 24.

Post-competition life
Saubert returned to Oregon and graduated from Oregon State University in Corvallis in 1966. She joined the Church of Jesus Christ of Latter-day Saints and earned a master's degree at Brigham Young University in Provo, Utah. While in Utah, she taught physical education training and worked as a ski instructor for several years before moving back to Oregon, where she taught elementary school in Hillsboro.

Saubert was inducted into the National Ski Hall of Fame in 1976, and the Oregon Sports Hall of Fame in 1983. She was chosen to be one of the torchbearers for the 2002 Winter Olympics in Salt Lake City, Utah.

Saubert was diagnosed with breast cancer in 2001, and died of the disease at age 65 in Bigfork, Montana where she lived, on May 14, 2007.

References

External links

 Jean Saubert at databaseOlympics.com
 
 

1942 births
2007 deaths
Sportspeople from Roseburg, Oregon
Converts to Mormonism
American female alpine skiers
Oregon State University alumni
Brigham Young University alumni
Alpine skiers at the 1964 Winter Olympics
Olympic silver medalists for the United States in alpine skiing
Olympic bronze medalists for the United States in alpine skiing
American Latter Day Saints
Deaths from breast cancer
Deaths from cancer in Montana
Sportspeople from Hillsboro, Oregon
Medalists at the 1964 Winter Olympics
Universiade medalists in alpine skiing
People from Bigfork, Montana
Universiade silver medalists for the United States
Competitors at the 1966 Winter Universiade